The 2009 season was Kelantan FA debut season in the Malaysia Super League. This article shows statistics of the club's players in the season, and also lists all matches that the club played in the season.

Competitions

Super League

Results by match

League table

FA Cup

The  2009 Malaysia FA Cup, known as the TM FA Cup due to the competition's sponsorship by Telekom Malaysia, is the 20th season of the Malaysia FA Cup, a knockout competition for Malaysia's state football association and clubs.

The FA Cup competition has reverted to the old format of play with no more open draws. It will comprise 29 teams 15 Super League and 14 Premier League sides with defending champions Kedah FA, Selangor FA and Terengganu FA receiving byes in the first round.

Malaysia Cup

The 2009 edition of Malaysia Cup started on 26 September 2009. Twenty teams took part in this prestigious competition. The teams were divided into five groups of four. The group leaders and the three best second-placed teams in the groups after six matches qualified to the quarterfinals.

Group E

Player statistics

Squad, appearances and goals

Source: Competitions

Goalscorers

Source: Competitions

Transfers

In

Out

See also
 List of Kelantan FA seasons

References

Kelantan FA
2009
Kelantan